Daniel Peter Hughes (born 16 February 1989) is an Australian first-class cricketer who plays for New South Wales. Hughes plays for New South Wales and made his Twenty20 debut on 26 December 2012 playing for Sydney Sixers against Hobart Hurricanes.

Domestic career 
Hughes played every match for New South Wales in the 2017–18 JLT One-Day Cup. He scored two centuries during the tournament, the first against South Australia in  45-run loss and the second against Queensland. He scored 122, his highest List A score, as part of a 192-run opening partnership with Nic Maddinson, for which he was named man of the match. This was also his fourth consecutive score of 50 or more in the tournament.

References 

Australian cricketers
1989 births
Living people
Sydney Sixers cricketers
Sydney Thunder cricketers
New South Wales cricketers